Jack Entertainment (formerly known as Rock Gaming LLC from 2009 to 2016) is a gaming, hospitality, and entertainment company based in Cleveland, Ohio. The company operates two gaming facilities in Ohio, Jack Cleveland Casino and Jack Thistledown Racino.

History

Rock Gaming (2009–2016) 
Jack Entertainment was founded as Rock Gaming in 2009 by seven businessmen led by Dan Gilbert, as chairman of its board and Matt Cullen as Chief Executive Officer. The company was formed as the seven men backed the Ohio Casino Approval and Tax Distribution Amendment, which was ultimately approved by voters in November 2009.

In May 2012, Rock Gaming, in a joint venture with Caesars Entertainment, opened Horseshoe Casino Cleveland as well as gained a stake in a Kentucky racetrack, Turfway Park. The company quickly expanded in 2013, opening ThistleDown Racino in the nearby Cleveland suburb of North Randall and Horseshoe Casino Cincinnati. In that same year, the company acquired the Greektown Casino-Hotel in Detroit.

In April 2015, the company took on an operational focus and was approved by Ohio Casino Control Commission to be licensed as a management company. That same year, Rock Gaming bought out Caesars's minority equity interests and management contract, and assumed full operational control and full ownership of its Ohio gaming properties.

Jack Entertainment (2016–present) 
On February 23, 2016, the company announced it was changing its name from Rock Gaming to Jack Entertainment. Throughout 2016, the company would also rebrand its casinos under the Jack name. The company stated it planned to spend $40 million on the rebranding. It also introduced a new customer loyalty program, ClubJack.

In September 2018, it was reported that Gilbert was looking to sell Jack Entertainment and exit the casino business. Two months later, Jack entered into an agreement to sell the Greektown casino to Vici Properties and Penn National Gaming for a total of $1 billion.

In September 2019, Jack Entertainment sold its Cincinnati casino for $745 million to Vici and Hard Rock International. The next month, Jack sold Turfway Park to Churchill Downs, Inc. for $36 million. In January 2020, the company also sold the real estate assets associated with its Cleveland casino and the Thistledown racino to Vici in a sale leaseback transaction.

Later in 2020, Gilbert sold his controlling stake in Jack Entertainment to a group of the company's managers, led by chairman Matthew Cullen and CEO Mark Dunkeson.

In June 2021, Jack moved its headquarters to Terminal Tower in Cleveland.

Properties

Former properties

See also

List of casinos in Ohio

References

External links 

 
 Rock Ventures – Gaming 

Gambling companies of the United States
Hospitality companies of the United States
Companies based in Cleveland
Entertainment companies established in 2009
2009 establishments in Michigan
Rock Ventures